Muddula Krishnayya is a 1986 Telugu-language film produced by S.Gopal Reddy under the Bhargav Art Productions banner and directed by Kodi Ramakrishna. It stars Nandamuri Balakrishna, Vijayashanti, Radha and music composed by K. V. Mahadevan.

Plot
The film begins in a village where a supercilious woman Mangalagiri Ramanamma rides over the public. Krishnayya an audacious nephew to Ramanamma's henpeck husband Appa Rao, bars her violations. Radha the vainglory daughter of Ramanamma moves in her mother's footsteps. After a series of donnybrooks, Radha crushes Krishnayya. Being conscious of it, Appa Rao schemes to reunite their bonds. So, he tells Ramanamma that the single way to bend Krishnayya is to knit him with Radha. After which, she too concurs and keeps a few constraints. Krishnayya also gains the proposal with causes. Currently, Appa Rao by hook handles the two and performs the nuptials. Soon after, Krishnayya orders Radha to accompany him which Ramanamma hinders. As it happens, Radha indicates the alike and rift arises between the couple. Forthwith, reaching home Krishnayya spots a strange pretty lady Shanti therein, claiming herself as his distant relative and showing excessive secretiveness.

The next morning, the whole village is startled by catching sight of Shanti comporting well-nigh to Krishnayya's wife which begrudges Ramanamma & Radha. Likewise, Krishnayya poses intimacy with Shanti to magnify their envy. Hence, they make various attempts to discard Shanti but in vain. After a while, Ramanamma detects Shanti as a popular film star and informs her men who land to retrieve her forcibly. Then, Krishnayya obstructs their way, seeks actuality and she reveals that she is his childhood blossom bestie. Right after her parent's death, she has been adopted by her aunt and made into an actress. Plus, she returned at the time of Krishnayya's wedding and screened the conflict she made in the play. Now Krishnayya decides to espouse Shanti which Radha also accepts. Thus, Shanti affirms Radha is reformed, quits the village, and says goodbye to Krishnayya. At last, Ramanamma admits one's error. Finally, the movie ends on a happy note with the reunion of Krishnayya & Radha.

Cast 
Nandamuri Balakrishna as Krishnayya
Vijayashanti as Vijaya
Radha as Radha
Gollapudi Maruti Rao as Appa Rao
S. Varalakshmi as Mangalagiri Ramanamma
K. K. Sarma
Telephone Satyanarayana
Juttu Narasimham
Dham as Priest
Kalpana Rai
Y. Vijaya
Nirmalamma

Soundtrack 

Music composed by K. V. Mahadevan. Lyrics were written by C. Narayana Reddy. Music released on SEA Records Audio Company.

References 

1986 films
Films directed by Kodi Ramakrishna
Films scored by K. V. Mahadevan
1980s Telugu-language films
Indian drama films